North Caucasian Soviet Republic (Severo-Kavkazskaya Sovetskaya Respublika)  (July 7–December, 1918) was a territory in the North Caucasus established to consolidate Soviet power during the Russian Civil War.  A republic of the Russian SFSR, it was created by merging the Kuban-Black Sea Soviet Republic, the Stavropol Soviet Republic, and the Terek Soviet Republic.  Its capital was Yekaterinodar; however, on August 17, 1918 Yekaterinodar was taken by Denikin's Volunteer Army, and the capital was moved to Pyatigorsk.

By the end of 1918, when the majority of the republic's territory was captured by the White Army, the All-Russian Central Executive Committee abolished the republic.

See also
 Mountainous Republic of the Northern Caucasus

Subdivisions of the Russian Soviet Federative Socialist Republic
Early Soviet republics
History of the North Caucasus
Chechen-speaking countries and territories
States and territories established in 1918
Former socialist republics
Post–Russian Empire states